El Rebollar is a subcomarca in the of the Comarca de Ciudad Rodrigo in the province of Salamanca, Castile and León.  It contains five municipalities:  El Payo, Navasfrías, Peñaparda, Robleda and Villasrubias. The Palra d'El Rebollal, an Asturleonese dialect, is spoken in the area.

References 

Comarcas of the Province of Salamanca